Show Court 2 (also known as 1573 Arena for sponsorship reasons) is the equal-fifth largest tennis court at Melbourne Park, in Melbourne, Australia, the venue of the Australian Open.

Overview
Show Court 2 was constructed along with the rest of the original Melbourne Park precinct in 1987, debuting at the 1988 Australian Open. The court has always been available on a walk-up basis for spectators at the Australian Open with a ground pass. It is located to the immediate west of Margaret Court Arena. The court has no roof, but includes seating and shaded areas, and is usually heavily populated in the first week of the Australian Open for outside matches. For the 2019 Australian Open and onwards, it was renamed 1573 Arena for commercial purposes, after Chinese distillery Luzhou Laojiao, producer of a baijiu labelled Guojiao 1573, made a five-year sponsorship deal with Tennis Australia, which also featured corner signage on both Margaret Court and Rod Laver Arena. The deal is speculated to be almost as expensive as Kia's major partnership deal with the Australian Open. The court has a permanent capacity of 3,000 people.

See also
 List of tennis stadiums by capacity
 Show Court 3 (Melbourne Park)

References

External links
 Show Court 2 at Austadiums.com
 Show Court 2 at AusOpen.com

Sports venues in Melbourne
Tennis venues in Australia
Buildings and structures in the City of Melbourne (LGA)
Sport in the City of Melbourne (LGA)